The Lost Chord is a 1925 American silent drama film directed by Wilfred Noy and starring David Powell, Alice Lake, and Dagmar Godowsky. It is based on Arthur Sullivan's 1877 song "The Lost Chord."  Noy had previously made the film in Great Britain in 1917 and this remake marked his American debut.

Plot
As described in a review in a film magazine, Arnold Grahme (Powell), celebrated organist, returning from abroad finds that his sweetheart, Madeline (Lake), has married Count Zara, who treats her brutally and has an affair with his "cousin," Pauline (Godowsky). Zara, jealous of Arnold, provokes a quarrel and in a duel fought later in Italy is killed by Arnold. Pauline in the meantime has persuaded Zara to kidnap his little daughter, Pauline. Madeline goes to a convent, Arnold tries to persuade her to marry him, and finally, speaking to her through his music, she agrees, but falls dead. Arnold’s nephew, Jack (Mack), quarrels with his chorus girl sweetheart Joan (Binney) and goes away. Arnold becomes interested in this girl because of her beautiful voice, falls in love with her and discovers she is Madeline's child. He proposes and is accepted, but the return of Jack reveals the fact that the young couple are in love with each other. Arnold sacrifices his own love that they may be happy, and while seeking solace at the organ the spirit of Madeline tells him "The Lost Chord" is the song of sacrifice the angels sing.

Cast

 David Powell as Arnold Grahme  
 Alice Lake as Madeline, Countess Zara  
 Dagmar Godowsky as Pauline Zara  
 Henry Sedley as Count Zara  
 Faire Binney as Joan  
 Louise Carter as Phyllis
 Charles W. Mack as Jack Brown (credited as Charles Mack)
 Dorothy Kingdon as Helene Brown
 Samuel E. Hines as Arthur Ames (credited as Samuel Hines)
 Signor N. Salerno as Levina
 Rita Maurice as Baby Joan

Preservation
With no prints of The Lost Chord located in any film archives, it is a lost film.

References

Bibliography
 Munden, Kenneth White. The American Film Institute Catalog of Motion Pictures Produced in the United States, Part 1. University of California Press, 1997.

External links

1925 films
1925 drama films
Silent American drama films
American silent feature films
1920s English-language films
Films directed by Wilfred Noy
American black-and-white films
American remakes of British films
Lost American films
1925 lost films
Lost drama films
Arrow Film Corporation films
1920s American films